Martenshoek is a neighbourhood of Hoogezand and former village in the Dutch province of Groningen. It is located in the municipality of Midden-Groningen, about 2 km west of the town of Hoogezand.

History 
The village was first mentioned in 1652 as St. Martenshoek, and means "neighbourhood with Martin of Tours as a patron saint". Martenshoek developed near the sluice on the Winschoterdiep. It was the gateway to the peat colonies, and developed into a trade and industry centre.

Martenshoek was home to 570 people in 1840. In 1905, a railway station opened in the village.

Martenshoek forms a single urban area with Hoogezand and is considered a neighbourhood of Hoogezand. A large part of the neighbourhood consists of industry.

Transportation
Railway station: Martenshoek

Gallery

References

External links 
 

Populated places in Groningen (province)
Midden-Groningen